Lorenzo Kreutter de Corvinis, O.S.B. (1658–1701) was a Roman Catholic prelate who served as Bishop of Vieste (1697–1701).

Biography
Lorenzo Kreutter de Corvinis was born in Rome, Italy on 4 December 1658 and ordained a priest in the Order of Saint Benedict.
On 20 November 1697, he was appointed during the papacy of Pope Innocent XII as Bishop of Vieste.
On 24 November 1697, he was consecrated bishop by Pier Matteo Petrucci, Cardinal-Priest of San Marcello, with Prospero Bottini, Titular Archbishop of Myra, and Giuseppe Felice Barlacci, Bishop Emeritus of Narni, serving as co-consecrators. 
He served as Bishop of Vieste until his death on 14 July 1701.

References

External links and additional sources
 (for Chronology of Bishops) 
 (for Chronology of Bishops)  

17th-century Italian Roman Catholic bishops
18th-century Italian Roman Catholic bishops
Bishops appointed by Pope Innocent XII
1658 births
1701 deaths
Clergy from Rome
Benedictine bishops